Islam is an Abrahamic, monotheistic religion. Muslims are those who adhere to that religion.
Islam may also refer to:
 Islam (name), surname or male given name

Film and television 
Islam: Empire of Faith, 2000 TV documentary series
Islam: The Untold Story, 2012 documentary film
Islam: What the West Needs to Know, 2006 documentary film

Books 
Islam: A Short History, 2000 book by Karen Armstrong
Islam: Beliefs and Observances, book by Caesar E. Farah
Islam: Beliefs and Teachings,  book by Ghulam Sarwar
Islam: Past, Present and Future, 2007 book by Hans Küng
Islam: The Straight Path, 1988 book by John L. Esposito

Places 
 Islam Latinski, village in Croatia
 Islam Grčki, village in Croatia